The list of shipwrecks in March 1886 includes ships sunk, foundered, grounded, or otherwise lost during March 1886.

1 March

2 March

3 March

4 March

5 March

6 March

7 March

8 March

9 March

11 March

12 March

13 March

14 March

15 March

16 March

17 March

18 March

19 March

20 March

21 March

22 March

23 March

25 March

26 March

27 March

28 March

29 March

30 March

31 March

Unknown date

References

1886-03
Maritime incidents in March 1886